Thelocactus macdowellii, called the Chihuahuan snowball, is a species of cactus native to northeastern Mexico. It has gained the Royal Horticultural Society's Award of Garden Merit.

References

macdowellii
Endemic flora of Mexico
Flora of Northeastern Mexico
Plants described in 1947